Ivesia aperta is a species of flowering plant in the rose family known by the common name Sierra Valley mousetail.

It is native to the High Sierra Nevada and Modoc Plateau of California and Nevada, where it grows in dry meadows on volcanic soils.

Descriptions
Ivesia aperta  is a perennial herb forming tufts of narrow, erect leaves and an erect stem reaching 10 to 45 centimeters in height. The stem is reddish and covered in a coat of shiny white hairs. The leaves emerge from the very base of the stem and reach erect to heights of 10 to 20 centimeters. Each leaf is made up of tightly overlapping white-hairy green leaflets. The stem and foliage are generally glandular and have a resinous scent.

Atop the stem is an inflorescence of several flower clusters, each cluster made up of 5 to 20 small yellow glandular flowers. Each individual flower has five thick, pointed, hairy sepals and five much smaller spoon-shaped yellow petals. At the center are many stamens and several pistils. The fruit is a tiny brown achene.

References

External links
Jepson Manual Treatment
Photos: var. aperta
Photos: var. canina

aperta
Flora of California
Flora of Nevada
Flora of the Great Basin
Flora of the Sierra Nevada (United States)
~
Endemic flora of the United States